State Highway 11  (SH 11) is a 30 kilometre stretch of highway in the North Island of New Zealand. Its main destination is the Bay of Islands township of Paihia. Until 2004, it terminated at Tohitapu Road, in southern Paihia township.

Route
First gazetted in 1997, SH 11 begins at a junction with SH 1 in Kawakawa. It heads north along the coast, passing west of Opua before entering Paihia along Paihia Road, Seaview Road and Marsden Road.

SH 11 provides access, via Paihia, to the Waitangi Treaty Grounds: the location where the Treaty of Waitangi was signed in 1840.

Major intersections

See also
List of New Zealand state highways
List of roads and highways, for notable or famous roads worldwide

References

External links
New Zealand Transport Agency

11
Transport in the Northland Region